The Fundamental Baptist Fellowship Association (FBFA) is an association of independent fundamentalist African-American Baptist churches.

In 1962 Reverend Richard C. Mattox, of Cleveland, Ohio, led conservative-fundamentalist black ministers and congregations to form the Fundamental Baptist Fellowship Association. The association meets annually and provides fundamentalist black Baptist churches a means of fellowship in the areas of evangelism and foreign missions. Each congregation is independent and autonomous.

A number of churches in the Fundamental Baptist Fellowship Association hold dual affiliation with the General Association of Regular Baptist Churches. Headquarters are in Kansas City, Kansas. In the area of Christian education, the FBFA partners with Cedarville University in Cedarville, Ohio.

The FBFA is sometimes confused with the predominantly white Fundamental Baptist Fellowship International, whose strength is in the Southeast. The FBFA is predominantly black and most of its churches are located in the Midwestern states.

References
Encyclopedia of American Religions, J. Gordon Melton, editor
Profiles in Belief: the Religious Bodies of the United States and Canada (Vol. II), by Arthur Carl Piepkorn

External links
Atlanta Bible Baptist Church - a member of the FBFA
Cedarville University

Christian organizations established in 1962
Cedarville University
Independent Baptist denominations
Historically African-American Christian denominations
Baptist denominations established in the 20th century